The FIFA World Cup is an international association football competition contested by the men's national teams of the members of Fédération Internationale de Football Association (FIFA), the sport's global governing body. The championship has been awarded every four years since the first tournament in 1930, except in 1942 and 1946, due to World War II.

The tournament consists of two parts, the qualification phase and the final phase (officially called the World Cup Finals). The qualification phase, which currently take place over the three years preceding the Finals, is used to determine which teams qualify for the Finals. The current format of the Finals involves 32 teams competing for the title, at venues within the host nation (or nations) over a period of about a month. The World Cup Finals is the most widely viewed sporting event in the world, with an estimated 715.1 million people watching the 2006 tournament final.

Cameroon have appeared in the Finals of the FIFA World Cup on eight occasions, the first being in 1982 where they drew all three group games and finished in 17th position. In 1990 Cameroon reached the quarter-finals before being defeated 3–2 by England. Roger Milla, at the age of 42, became the oldest player ever to appear in a World Cup Finals at the 1994 FIFA World Cup, where he also managed to score. The record for oldest player was broken in 2014 by Colombian goalkeeper Faryd Mondragón, but Milla is still the oldest goalscorer at FIFA World Cup Finals.

They made their eighth appearance at the finals in the 2022 FIFA World Cup in Qatar.

Record at the FIFA World Cup

*Denotes draws including knockout matches decided via penalty shoot-out.

By match

Record by opponent

Spain 1982

Squad
Head coach:  Jean Vincent

Matches

Grégoire M'Bida scored the first ever goal for Cameroon in the World Cup Finals when he hooked the ball home with his right foot past the advancing goalkeeper from inside the six yard box after the ball had been headed on to him from a high ball inside the penalty area. The goal came one minute after Italy had taken the lead in the game after missing several chances to score in the first half.

Italy 1990

Squad
Head coach:  Valery Nepomnyashchy

Argentina vs Cameroon

Omam-Biyik scored with a downward header from six yards out the after the ball had been looped into the air. Nery Pumpido allowed the weak header to go under his body and into the net.

Cameroon vs Romania

Cameroon vs Soviet Union

Cameroon vs Colombia

England vs Cameroon

United States 1994

Squad
Head coach:  Henri Michel

Matches
Embé got the equalizing goal for Cameroon in the 31st minute when he side-footed into an empty net from close range after a pass from the left. Omam-Biyik then scored to put Cameroon in front in the 47th minute when he ran onto a long ball into the box before flicking the ball right footed past the advancing goalkeeper from eight yards out.

France 1998

Squad
Head coach:  Claude Le Roy

Matches

South Korea/Japan 2002

Squad
Head coach:  Winfried Schäfer

Matches

South Africa 2010

Squad

Group E Final Standings
The winners of this group, Netherlands, advanced to face the Group F runners-up, Slovakia, while Japan, as Group E runners-up, faced Group F winners Paraguay. Cameroon was the first team to be eliminated in the World Cup, following their 2–1 defeat by Denmark on 19 June 2010.

All times local (UTC+02)

Group E Matches

Japan vs Cameroon

Cameroon vs Denmark

Cameroon vs Netherlands

Brazil 2014

Group A Final Standings

Brazil advance to play Chile (runner-up of Group B) in the round of 16.
Mexico advance to play Netherlands (winner of Group B) in the round of 16.

Mexico vs Cameroon

Cameroon vs Croatia

Cameroon vs Brazil

Qatar 2022

Group stage

Record players

Top goalscorers

Cameroon's top goalscorer at FIFA World Cup finals, Roger Milla, also holds the record as oldest player to ever score at a FIFA World Cup. When he scored his goal during the 1–6 defeat against Russia in 1994, he was aged 42 years and 39 days.

Individual awards
Roger Milla won the Bronze Boot in 1990. He is the only individual award winner ever from Africa. At the age of 38 at the time, he is also the oldest boot award winner to date.

References

External links
Cameroon at FIFA

 
Countries at the FIFA World Cup
World Cup